The Koçgiri tribe is a collection or confederation of Kurdish Alevi tribes, of mainly from Sivas Province (and also Erzincan Province), in Turkey. They are mostly speakers of a dialect of Kurmanji, some of them also speak Zaza.

Etymology 
The origin of the name Koçgiri is disputed, there are two main opposing points of view:
 Qoçgirî may originally mean «Great migration» in the Kurdish language, qoç (migration) being itself a loanword from a Turkic language,
 It may be a Turkic tribal name, the first part of the name koç meaning "ram". The early form of koç in Turkish (koçkar or qoçqar, qočuŋar in Old Turkic), seems alike to Koçkiri which is the old spelling of the tribe's name.

History 

Some scholars state that they may be, at least partly, of Turkic ancestry. Some of them describe themselves as ethnic Turks that has been Kurdified.

Ottoman tax records in the 1360-1370's mention the name of Koçgiri, indicating that a so named region or tribe paid their taxes to the Ottomans.
They are known to have initiated the Koçgiri rebellion that occurred in March 1921, during the Turkish War of Independence. About 5,000 rebels, including Sunni tribes having joined the uprising later, fought against the Grand National Assembly. They were defeated on 17 June.

References

Sources 
  

Alevis
Kurds in Turkey
Kurdish tribes